Verney Lovett Cameron (1842 – 27 May 1881) was an Australian cricketer. He played two first-class cricket matches for Victoria in 1863.

Cameron was the only non-family member to attend the private funeral of cricketer and Australian rules football pioneer Tom Wills, and attempted, without success, to raise funds to erect a headstone over his gravesite. His cousin, Verney Lovett Cameron, was a 19th-century explorer.

See also
 List of Victoria first-class cricketers

References

1842 births
1881 deaths
Australian cricketers
Victoria cricketers
Cricketers from Melbourne
Melbourne Cricket Club cricketers
People from Sorrento, Victoria